The 1995–96 Welsh Alliance League was the twelfth season of the Welsh Alliance League after its establishment in 1984. The league was won by Denbigh Town.

League table

References

External links
Welsh Alliance League

Welsh Alliance League seasons
3